Piffard is a surname. Notable people with the surname include:

 Harold H. Piffard (1867–1939), British artist and illustrator
 Henry Piffard (1842–1910), American dermatologist

Other uses
 Piffard, New York state, a hamlet

Surnames of French origin